Bıçakçı can refer to:

 Bıçakçı Bridge
 Bıçakçı, Alanya
 Bıçakçı, Batman
 Bıçakçı, Çameli